Jandiali is a village in Shaheed Bhagat Singh Nagar district of Punjab State, India. The village is administrated by Sarpanch an elected representative of the village.

Demography 
As of 2011, Jandiali has a total number of 438 houses and population of 2115 of which 1115 include are males while 1000 are females according to the report published by Census India in 2011. The literacy rate of Jandiali is 81.39%, lower than the state average of 75.84%. The population of children under the age of 6 years is 191 which is 9.03% of total population of Jandiali, and child sex ratio is approximately 769 as compared to Punjab state average of 846.

Most of the people are from Schedule Caste which constitutes 62.65% of total population in Jandiali. The town does not have any Schedule Tribe population so far.

As per the report published by Census India in 2011, 778 people were engaged in work activities out of the total population of Jandiali which includes 630 males and 148 females. According to census survey report 2011, 82.26% workers describe their work as main work and 17.74% workers are involved in Marginal activity providing livelihood for less than 6 months.

Education 
The village has Punjabi medium, primary school for girls founded in 1958 and a primary school for boys founded in 1936. The schools provide mid-day meal as per Indian Midday Meal Scheme. The school provide free education to children between the ages of 6 and 14 as per Right of Children to Free and Compulsory Education Act.

Transport 

See also 
List of villages in India
Mandali caste

References

External links 
 Tourism of Punjab
 Census of Punjab
 Locality Based PINCode

Villages in Shaheed Bhagat Singh Nagar district